The following is a list of Italian-American women writers.

A–C

Kim Addonizio
Carol Bonomo Albright
Susanne Antonetta
Penny Arcade
Romina Arena
Dodici Azpadu
Cheryl B
Helen Barolini
Gina Barreca
Dorothy Barresi
Gloria Vitanza Basile
Marion Benasutti
Adria Bernardi
Lucia Chiavola Birnbaum
Mary Jo Bona
Dorothy Bryant
Mary Bucci Bush
Louisa Calio
Mary Cappello
Mary Caponegro
Nancy Carnevale
Mary Beth Caschetta
Grace Cavalieri
Diana Cavallo
Rita Ciresi
Maryann Zillotti Corbett
Paola Corso

D–J

Tina DeRosa
Louise DeSalvo
Rachel Guido deVries
Diane DiPrima
Grace DiSanto
Beverly D'Onofrio
Ree Dragonette
Jean Feraca
Sandra Mortola Gilbert
Maria Mazziotti Gillan
Daniela Gioseffi
Edvige Giunta
Mary Gordon
Rose Basile Green
Rose Grieco
Jennifer Guglielmo
Barbara Grizzuti Harrison
Josephine Gattuso Hendin
Joanna Clapps Herman
Ann Hood

K–M

 Victoria Lancelotta
 Annie Lanzillotto
 Maria Laurino
 Donna Leon
 LindaAnn Loschiavo
 Anne Marie Macari
 Karen Malpede
 Donna Masini
 Carole Maso
 Cris Mazza
 Christine Palamidessi Moore

N–R

 Donna Jo Napoli
 Anne Paolucci
 Lucia Perillo
 Lia Purpura
 Anna Quindlen
 Kym Ragusa
 Michelle Reale
 Rose Romano
 Agnes Rossi
 Suze Rotolo

S–Z

 Julia Savarese
 Nancy Savoca
 Sandra Scoppettone
 Lisa Scottoline
 Maria Terrone
 Karen Tintori
 Mari Tomasi
 Adriana Trigiani
 Danielle Trussoni
 Catherine Tufariello
 Octavia Waldo
 Frances Winwar (Francesca Vinciguerra)

See also

 Italian-American women
 Angelology by Danielle Trussoni
 Big Stone Gap by Adriana Trigiani
 Black and Blue by Anna Quindlen
 Commissario Brunetti series by Donna Leon
 The Company of Women by Mary Gordon
 Daughter of Venice by Donna Jo Napoli
 Death at La Fenice by Donna Leon
 Death in a Strange Country by Donna Leon
 Hush: An Irish Princess' Tale by Donna Jo Napoli
 If These Walls Could Talk by Nancy Savoca
 The Kin of Ata Are Waiting for You by Dorothy Bryant
 Like Lesser Gods by Mari Tomasi
 The Madwoman in the Attic by Sandra Gilbert
 Object Lessons by Anna Quindlen
 Paper Fish by Tina DeRosa
 Riding in Cars with Boys by Beverly D'Onofrio
 Rosato & Associates series by Lisa Scottoline
 The Smile by Donna Jo Napoli
 Stones in Water by Donna Jo Napoli
 Suzuki Beane by Sandra Scopettone
 Sweet Hope by Mary Bucci Bush
 True Love by Nancy Savoca
 Umbertina by Helen Barolini
 Were You Always an Italian? by Maria Laurino

References

External links 
 Malìa: A Collective of Italian American Women

Italian-American literature
Lists of American people of Italian descent
Lists of American writers
Lists of American women
American women writers